The Inter Glacier or Interglacier is a small glacier on the northeast face of Mount Rainier in Washington. The body of ice has a volume of 0.6 billion feet3 (17 million m3) and covers an area of 0.3 mile2 (0.8 km2). The glacier lies on top of a wedge called the Steamboat Prow in between the Emmons Glacier to the south and the Winthrop Glacier to the north. The gentle topography under the glacier results in a smooth glacial surface with little in the way of crevasses. A small subsidiary peak of Rainier, named Mount Ruth, lies adjacent to the glacier. Meltwater from the glacier drains into the White River.

See also
List of glaciers

References

Glaciers of Mount Rainier
Glaciers of Washington (state)